The Finnish national road 54 is the 2nd class main route between the municipalities of Hollola and Tammela in southern Finland. It runs from Airikkala in Hollola passes through the Riihimäki town and little part of Hämeenlinna town to the national road 10 in Tammela, where it turns into a smaller regional road going to the Teuro village.

Route 

The road passes through the following localities:
Hollola (Airikkala)
Kärkölä (Järvelä and Lappila)
Hausjärvi (Mommila, Oitti and Karhi)
Riihimäki
Loppi (Kormu, Launonen, Loppi, Topeno and Vojakkala)
Hämeenlinna (Lietsa)
Tammela

References

External links

Roads in Finland